Breckfield ward was an electoral district of Liverpool City Council. It was created in 1895 from parts of the Everton and Kirkdale wards.

The ward was dissolved prior to the 2004 Liverpool City Council Elections and distributed into the re-arranged Everton and Anfield wards.

Boundaries
In the Local Government Boundary Commission's Report on the 1980 reorganisation the proposed new boundaries for the ward were described as "Commencing at a point where Aubrey Street meets Everton Road, thence northwestwards along said road and Heyworth Street to Grecian Terrace, thence southwestwards along said terrace and Havelock Street to Netherfield Road North, thence northwestwards along said road and continuing northwestwards along the eastern boundary of Vauxhall Ward to the southwestern boundary of Melrose Ward, thence northeastwards along said boundary to Anfield Road, thence southeastwards along said road to Back Rockfield Road, thence southeastwards along said road to a point opposite the rear boundaries of Nos. 24-2 Lake Street, thence southwestwards along said boundaries to a point opposite the rear boundary of the Public House (No. 185), in Walton Breck Road, thence southeastwards to and along said boundary and southwestwards along the eastern boundary of said Public House to Walton Breck Road, thence southeastwards along said road to Oakfield Road, thence southeastwards along said road and Belmont Road to Whitefield Road, thence southwestwards along said road to and southwestwards along the unnamed road north of Prince Rupert County Primary School to Whitefield Way, thence continuing southwestwards along said way, crossing Queen's Road and continuing southwestwards in a straight line to the junction of Hodson Place and Margaret Street, thence southwards along said street to Aubrey Street, thence southwestwards along said street to the point of commencement."

Councillors
The ward has returned eleven councillors.

 indicates seat up for re-election after boundary changes.

 indicates seat up for re-election.

 indicates change in affiliation.

 indicates seat up for re-election after casual vacancy.

References

Wards of Liverpool